Abena Takyiwa (born 25 December 1958) is a Ghanaian politician and a member of the first Parliament of the fourth Republic representing the Kwabre constituency in the Ashanti region.

Early life and education
Abena was born on 25 December 1958 at Kwabre in the Ashanti Region of Ghana. She holds a Diploma in Fashion Design and Catering.

Politics
Abena was first elected into Parliament on the ticket of the National Democratic Congress during the December 1992 Ghanaian General Election to represent the Kwabre Constituency of the Ashanti Region of Ghana. She served for one term as a member of parliament. She was succeeded by Nana Asante Frimpong of the New Patriotic Party during the 1996 Ghanaian general elections. He polled 33,035 votes representing 58.80% of the total valid votes cast against Oppong Kyekyeku Kwaku Kaaky of the National Democratic Congress who polled 10,808 votes representing 19.20%, Kwaku Dua-Twum of the National Congress Party also polled 1,499 votes representing 2.70%, and Abdullah Uthman of the People's National Congress polled 0 vote representing 0.00%.

Career
Abena is a Printer and a Fashion designer by profession. She is the Former member of parliament for the Kwabre constituency in the Ashanti Region of Ghana.

Personal life 
Abena is a Christian.

References

1958 births
Ghanaian fashion designers
Ghanaian women fashion designers
National Democratic Congress (Ghana) politicians
People from Ashanti Region
Ghanaian MPs 1993–1997
20th-century Ghanaian politicians
Living people